In enzymology, a 4-hydroxymandelate oxidase is an enzyme that catalyzes the chemical reaction

(S)-2-hydroxy-2-(4-hydroxyphenyl)acetate + O2  4-hydroxybenzaldehyde + CO2 + H2O2

Thus, the two substrates of this enzyme are (S)-2-hydroxy-2-(4-hydroxyphenyl)acetate and O2, whereas its 3 products are 4-hydroxybenzaldehyde, CO2, and H2O2.

This enzyme belongs to the family of oxidoreductases, specifically those acting on the CH-OH group of donor with oxygen as acceptor.  The systematic name of this enzyme class is (S)-2-hydroxy-2-(4-hydroxyphenyl)acetate:oxygen 1-oxidoreductase. This enzyme is also called L-4-hydroxymandelate oxidase (decarboxylating).  It has 2 cofactors: FAD,  and Manganese.

References

 

EC 1.1.3
Flavoproteins
Manganese enzymes
Enzymes of unknown structure